Orqueta is a settlement located in the north center of Lafonia, on East Falkland, Falkland Islands, on the Orqueta Creek and west of Bodie Creek. The name in Falkland Islands English of Orqueta goes back to the gauchos rioplatenses that inhabited the area around the middle of the nineteenth century and refers to the Paspalum notatum.

References

Populated places on East Falkland